The 1992 Columbia Lions football team was an American football team that represented Columbia University during the 1992 NCAA Division I-AA football season. Columbia tied for second-to-last in the Ivy League. 

In their fourth season under head coach Ray Tellier, the Lions compiled a 3–7 record and were outscored 286 to 205. Des Werthman was the team captain.  

The Lions' 2–5 conference record tied for sixth in the Ivy League standings. Columbia was outscored 214 to 136 by Ivy opponents. 

Columbia played its homes games at Lawrence A. Wien Stadium in Upper Manhattan, in New York City.

Schedule

References

Columbia
Columbia Lions football seasons
Columbia Lions football